Gloria Chang Wan-ki (張韻琪) is the former president of The Hong Kong University Students' Union (2000), who was a main critic of the university leaders during the "Pollgate" controversy concerning government pressure on Robert Chung Ting-yiu, who conducted polls. 

She was a major contributor to the resignation of the former Vice Chancellor of The University of Hong Kong (HKU) Professor Cheng Yiu-chung. Gloria Chang has been arrested for "illegal assembly" when protesting university fees in 2000. As of February 2007 she was working at Greenpeace Hong Kong as a climate and energy campaigner. She is also a Roman Catholic.

Chang, along with HKU politics professor Joseph Chan were the middlemen in coordinating the televised debate between protest leaders and government officials amid the 2014 Umbrella Movement. She opposed the confrontational, non-cooperative approach of radical protesters and called for dialogue and compromise on both sides.

References 

Hong Kong environmentalists
Hong Kong women environmentalists
Alumni of the University of Hong Kong
Hong Kong democracy activists
Living people
Hong Kong Roman Catholics
Year of birth missing (living people)